The 2005–06 Los Angeles Kings season was the 39th season (38th season of play) for the National Hockey League franchise. It began with wholesale changes, as during the off-season the Kings acquired centers Pavol Demitra and Jeremy Roenick to help solidify their offense, as well as goaltender Jason LaBarbera.

The changes appeared to pay off, as the Kings stormed out to a 15–6–1 record, and first place in the division. The team, however, collapsed, winning only 27 of their remaining 60 games, finishing fourth in the Pacific Division, and out of the playoffs for the third consecutive season. Head Coach Andy Murray was fired for their final 12 games with John Torchetti taking over, despite the team finishing with an impressive 42 wins.

Regular season
 January 19, 2006 – Luc Robitaille becomes the Kings' all-time leading goal scorer.

The Kings finished the regular season with the most power play opportunities, tying the Phoenix Coyotes with 541. They also finished 30th overall in penalty-kill percentage, at 78.73%.

Final standings

Schedule and results

|- align="center" bgcolor="#FFBBBB"
|1||L||October 5, 2005||4–5 || align="left"| @ Dallas Stars (2005–06) ||0–1–0 || 
|- align="center" bgcolor="#CCFFCC" 
|2||W||October 6, 2005||3–2 || align="left"|  Phoenix Coyotes (2005–06) ||1–1–0 || 
|- align="center" bgcolor="#CCFFCC" 
|3||W||October 9, 2005||2–1 OT|| align="left"|  Minnesota Wild (2005–06) ||2–1–0 || 
|- align="center" bgcolor="#CCFFCC" 
|4||W||October 11, 2005||3–1 || align="left"|  Edmonton Oilers (2005–06) ||3–1–0 || 
|- align="center" bgcolor="#FFBBBB"
|5||L||October 13, 2005||2–5 || align="left"|  Detroit Red Wings (2005–06) ||3–2–0 || 
|- align="center" bgcolor="#CCFFCC" 
|6||W||October 16, 2005||3–1 || align="left"|  Columbus Blue Jackets (2005–06) ||4–2–0 || 
|- align="center" bgcolor="#CCFFCC" 
|7||W||October 19, 2005||5–4 || align="left"| @ Colorado Avalanche (2005–06) ||5–2–0 || 
|- align="center" bgcolor="#CCFFCC" 
|8||W||October 20, 2005||7–2 || align="left"| @ Dallas Stars (2005–06) ||6–2–0 || 
|- align="center" bgcolor="#FFBBBB"
|9||L||October 23, 2005||2–3 || align="left"|  Calgary Flames (2005–06) ||6–3–0 || 
|- align="center" bgcolor="#CCFFCC" 
|10||W||October 25, 2005||3–1 || align="left"|  Mighty Ducks of Anaheim (2005–06) ||7–3–0 || 
|- align="center" bgcolor="#FFBBBB"
|11||L||October 28, 2005||4–5 || align="left"|  San Jose Sharks (2005–06) ||7–4–0 || 
|- align="center" bgcolor="#CCFFCC" 
|12||W||October 29, 2005||5–2 || align="left"|  St. Louis Blues (2005–06) ||8–4–0 || 
|-

|- align="center" bgcolor="#CCFFCC" 
|13||W||November 2, 2005||6–3 || align="left"| @ Dallas Stars (2005–06) ||9–4–0 || 
|- align="center" bgcolor="#FFBBBB"
|14||L||November 3, 2005||0–4 || align="left"| @ Phoenix Coyotes (2005–06) ||9–5–0 || 
|- align="center" bgcolor="#CCFFCC" 
|15||W||November 5, 2005||3–2 SO|| align="left"|  Nashville Predators (2005–06) ||10–5–0 || 
|- align="center" 
|16||L||November 9, 2005||4–5 OT|| align="left"| @ Detroit Red Wings (2005–06) ||10–5–1 || 
|- align="center" bgcolor="#CCFFCC" 
|17||W||November 11, 2005||4–2 || align="left"| @ Chicago Blackhawks (2005–06) ||11–5–1 || 
|- align="center" bgcolor="#CCFFCC" 
|18||W||November 13, 2005||8–2 || align="left"| @ Columbus Blue Jackets (2005–06) ||12–5–1 || 
|- align="center" bgcolor="#FFBBBB"
|19||L||November 15, 2005||2–3 || align="left"| @ Nashville Predators (2005–06) ||12–6–1 || 
|- align="center" bgcolor="#CCFFCC" 
|20||W||November 17, 2005||5–4 || align="left"|  Vancouver Canucks (2005–06) ||13–6–1 || 
|- align="center" bgcolor="#CCFFCC" 
|21||W||November 19, 2005||4–3 || align="left"|  Colorado Avalanche (2005–06) ||14–6–1 || 
|- align="center" bgcolor="#CCFFCC" 
|22||W||November 22, 2005||6–3 || align="left"| @ St. Louis Blues (2005–06) ||15–6–1 || 
|- align="center" bgcolor="#FFBBBB"
|23||L||November 24, 2005||3–4 || align="left"| @ Nashville Predators (2005–06) ||15–7–1 || 
|- align="center" bgcolor="#CCFFCC" 
|24||W||November 26, 2005||3–2 || align="left"|  Chicago Blackhawks (2005–06) ||16–7–1 || 
|- align="center" bgcolor="#FFBBBB"
|25||L||November 28, 2005||2–5 || align="left"|  Detroit Red Wings (2005–06) ||16–8–1 || 
|- align="center" bgcolor="#FFBBBB"
|26||L||November 30, 2005||2–3 || align="left"| @ Chicago Blackhawks (2005–06) ||16–9–1 || 
|-

|- align="center" bgcolor="#FFBBBB"
|27||L||December 2, 2005||1–5 || align="left"| @ Ottawa Senators (2005–06) ||16–10–1 || 
|- align="center" bgcolor="#FFBBBB"
|28||L||December 3, 2005||2–3 || align="left"| @ Montreal Canadiens (2005–06) ||16–11–1 || 
|- align="center" bgcolor="#CCFFCC" 
|29||W||December 6, 2005||2–1 || align="left"| @ Toronto Maple Leafs (2005–06) ||17–11–1 || 
|- align="center" bgcolor="#FFBBBB"
|30||L||December 8, 2005||2–3 || align="left"|  Carolina Hurricanes (2005–06) ||17–12–1 || 
|- align="center" bgcolor="#CCFFCC" 
|31||W||December 10, 2005||3–1 || align="left"|  Florida Panthers (2005–06) ||18–12–1 || 
|- align="center" bgcolor="#FFBBBB"
|32||L||December 14, 2005||2–3 || align="left"|  Washington Capitals (2005–06) ||18–13–1 || 
|- align="center" bgcolor="#CCFFCC" 
|33||W||December 16, 2005||4–3 SO|| align="left"| @ Mighty Ducks of Anaheim (2005–06) ||19–13–1 || 
|- align="center" bgcolor="#CCFFCC" 
|34||W||December 17, 2005||4–1 || align="left"|  Phoenix Coyotes (2005–06) ||20–13–1 || 
|- align="center" bgcolor="#CCFFCC" 
|35||W||December 19, 2005||4–3 SO|| align="left"| @ Vancouver Canucks (2005–06) ||21–13–1 || 
|- align="center" bgcolor="#CCFFCC" 
|36||W||December 21, 2005||5–2 || align="left"| @ Calgary Flames (2005–06) ||22–13–1 || 
|- align="center" bgcolor="#FFBBBB"
|37||L||December 23, 2005||3–5 || align="left"| @ Edmonton Oilers (2005–06) ||22–14–1 || 
|- align="center" bgcolor="#CCFFCC" 
|38||W||December 26, 2005||4–3 || align="left"|  San Jose Sharks (2005–06) ||23–14–1 || 
|- align="center" bgcolor="#CCFFCC" 
|39||W||December 28, 2005||5–3 || align="left"| @ Colorado Avalanche (2005–06) ||24–14–1 || 
|- align="center" 
|40||L||December 29, 2005||5–6 OT|| align="left"| @ Phoenix Coyotes (2005–06) ||24–14–2 || 
|- align="center" bgcolor="#CCFFCC" 
|41||W||December 31, 2005||3–2 || align="left"| @ Dallas Stars (2005–06) ||25–14–2 || 
|-

|- align="center" bgcolor="#CCFFCC" 
|42||W||January 2, 2006||3–2 OT|| align="left"|  Dallas Stars (2005–06) ||26–14–2 || 
|- align="center" bgcolor="#CCFFCC" 
|43||W||January 5, 2006||4–0 || align="left"|  Phoenix Coyotes (2005–06) ||27–14–2 || 
|- align="center" bgcolor="#FFBBBB"
|44||L||January 7, 2006||2–3 || align="left"| @ San Jose Sharks (2005–06) ||27–15–2 || 
|- align="center" bgcolor="#FFBBBB"
|45||L||January 9, 2006||2–6 || align="left"| @ Mighty Ducks of Anaheim (2005–06) ||27–16–2 || 
|- align="center" bgcolor="#CCFFCC" 
|46||W||January 12, 2006||6–0 || align="left"| @ Boston Bruins (2005–06) ||28–16–2 || 
|- align="center" bgcolor="#FFBBBB"
|47||L||January 14, 2006||1–10 || align="left"| @ Buffalo Sabres (2005–06) ||28–17–2 || 
|- align="center" bgcolor="#FFBBBB"
|48||L||January 17, 2006||1–4 || align="left"|  Tampa Bay Lightning (2005–06) ||28–18–2 || 
|- align="center" bgcolor="#CCFFCC" 
|49||W||January 19, 2006||8–6 || align="left"|  Atlanta Thrashers (2005–06) ||29–18–2 || 
|- align="center" 
|50||L||January 21, 2006||3–4 OT|| align="left"|  San Jose Sharks (2005–06) ||29–18–3 || 
|- align="center" bgcolor="#CCFFCC" 
|51||W||January 23, 2006||3–2 SO|| align="left"|  Mighty Ducks of Anaheim (2005–06) ||30–18–3 || 
|- align="center" bgcolor="#FFBBBB"
|52||L||January 24, 2006||1–4 || align="left"| @ San Jose Sharks (2005–06) ||30–19–3 || 
|- align="center" bgcolor="#FFBBBB"
|53||L||January 26, 2006||3–5 || align="left"|  Edmonton Oilers (2005–06) ||30–20–3 || 
|- align="center" bgcolor="#FFBBBB"
|54||L||January 28, 2006||2–6 || align="left"|  Mighty Ducks of Anaheim (2005–06) ||30–21–3 || 
|- align="center" 
|55||L||January 30, 2006||3–4 OT|| align="left"| @ Mighty Ducks of Anaheim (2005–06) ||30–21–4 || 
|-

|- align="center" 
|56||L||February 2, 2006||1–2 SO|| align="left"| @ Phoenix Coyotes (2005–06) ||30–21–5 || 
|- align="center" bgcolor="#FFBBBB"
|57||L||February 7, 2006||1–5 || align="left"| @ Minnesota Wild (2005–06) ||30–22–5 || 
|- align="center" bgcolor="#FFBBBB"
|58||L||February 8, 2006||4–7 || align="left"| @ Columbus Blue Jackets (2005–06) ||30–23–5 || 
|- align="center" bgcolor="#CCFFCC" 
|59||W||February 11, 2006||5–4 OT|| align="left"|  Chicago Blackhawks (2005–06) ||31–23–5 || 
|- align="center" bgcolor="#CCFFCC" 
|60||W||February 12, 2006||6–5 || align="left"|  Dallas Stars (2005–06) ||32–23–5 || 
|-

|- align="center" bgcolor="#CCFFCC" 
|61||W||March 2, 2006||3–2 || align="left"|  Minnesota Wild (2005–06) ||33–23–5 || 
|- align="center" bgcolor="#CCFFCC" 
|62||W||March 4, 2006||3–2 || align="left"|  Columbus Blue Jackets (2005–06) ||34–23–5 || 
|- align="center" bgcolor="#CCFFCC" 
|63||W||March 7, 2006||3–2 OT|| align="left"| @ Minnesota Wild (2005–06) ||35–23–5 || 
|- align="center" bgcolor="#FFBBBB"
|64||L||March 9, 2006||3–7 || align="left"| @ Detroit Red Wings (2005–06) ||35–24–5 || 
|- align="center" bgcolor="#CCFFCC" 
|65||W||March 11, 2006||2–1 SO|| align="left"| @ St. Louis Blues (2005–06) ||36–24–5 || 
|- align="center" bgcolor="#FFBBBB"
|66||L||March 13, 2006||3–4 || align="left"| @ San Jose Sharks (2005–06) ||36–25–5 || 
|- align="center" bgcolor="#FFBBBB"
|67||L||March 14, 2006||2–6 || align="left"|  Phoenix Coyotes (2005–06) ||36–26–5 || 
|- align="center" bgcolor="#FFBBBB"
|68||L||March 16, 2006||1–4 || align="left"|  Dallas Stars (2005–06) ||36–27–5 || 
|- align="center" bgcolor="#CCFFCC" 
|69||W||March 18, 2006||3–1 || align="left"|  St. Louis Blues (2005–06) ||37–27–5 || 
|- align="center" bgcolor="#FFBBBB"
|70||L||March 20, 2006||0–5 || align="left"|  Colorado Avalanche (2005–06) ||37–28–5 || 
|- align="center" bgcolor="#CCFFCC" 
|71||W||March 25, 2006||6–4 || align="left"|  Nashville Predators (2005–06) ||38–28–5 || 
|- align="center" bgcolor="#FFBBBB"
|72||L||March 27, 2006||4–7 || align="left"| @ Vancouver Canucks (2005–06) ||38–29–5 || 
|- align="center" bgcolor="#FFBBBB"
|73||L||March 29, 2006||1–2 || align="left"| @ Calgary Flames (2005–06) ||38–30–5 || 
|- align="center" bgcolor="#FFBBBB"
|74||L||March 30, 2006||0–4 || align="left"| @ Edmonton Oilers (2005–06) ||38–31–5 || 
|-

|- align="center" bgcolor="#CCFFCC" 
|75||W||April 1, 2006||1–0 || align="left"|  Dallas Stars (2005–06) ||39–31–5 || 
|- align="center" bgcolor="#CCFFCC" 
|76||W||April 3, 2006||1–0 || align="left"|  Vancouver Canucks (2005–06) ||40–31–5 || 
|- align="center" bgcolor="#FFBBBB"
|77||L||April 4, 2006||2–6 || align="left"| @ Mighty Ducks of Anaheim (2005–06) ||40–32–5 || 
|- align="center" bgcolor="#FFBBBB"
|78||L||April 6, 2006||0–5 || align="left"|  San Jose Sharks (2005–06) ||40–33–5 || 
|- align="center" bgcolor="#FFBBBB"
|79||L||April 8, 2006||2–4 || align="left"|  Mighty Ducks of Anaheim (2005–06) ||40–34–5 || 
|- align="center" bgcolor="#FFBBBB"
|80||L||April 13, 2006||0–3 || align="left"| @ Phoenix Coyotes (2005–06) ||40–35–5 || 
|- align="center" bgcolor="#CCFFCC" 
|81||W||April 15, 2006||2–1 SO|| align="left"|  Calgary Flames (2005–06) ||41–35–5 || 
|- align="center" bgcolor="#CCFFCC" 
|82||W||April 17, 2006||4–0 || align="left"| @ San Jose Sharks (2005–06) ||42–35–5 || 
|-

|-
| Legend:

Player statistics

Scoring
 Position abbreviations: C = Center; D = Defense; G = Goaltender; LW = Left Wing; RW = Right Wing
  = Joined team via a transaction (e.g., trade, waivers, signing) during the season. Stats reflect time with the Kings only.
  = Left team via a transaction (e.g., trade, waivers, release) during the season. Stats reflect time with the Kings only.

Goaltending

Awards and records

Awards

Transactions
The Kings were involved in the following transactions from February 17, 2005, the day after the 2004–05 NHL season was officially cancelled, through June 19, 2006, the day of the deciding game of the 2006 Stanley Cup Finals.

Trades

Players acquired

Players lost

Signings

Draft picks
Los Angeles's picks at the 2005 NHL Entry Draft held at the Westin Hotel in Ottawa, Ontario on July 30, 2005.

See also
2005–06 NHL season

Notes

References

Los
Los
Los Angeles Kings seasons
LA Kings
LA Kings